The Jersey International Air Display is an air show which is held every year on the island of Jersey, in the Channel Islands. It normally consists of one air display and two static displays - one at the airport and one in a park in St. Helier.

It is a non-profit-making event, and relies upon sponsorship and government funding. The main display can be watched by the public, free of charge.

Some of the aircraft carry out displays over Guernsey, as part of the Guernsey Air Display (formerly the Guernsey Battle of Britain Air Display), on the same day.

Performers

Regular performers include the Red Arrows, RAF Falcons parachute display team, and the Battle of Britain Memorial Flight.

Notable appearances include;

History

In 1997, Mike Higgins became the display organiser.

In 2009, HMS Ocean (L12) was present, and participated in the event.

The 2011 air display was canceled, due to poor visibility, shortly before it was due to start. Most aircraft which were due to take part had already arrived at the island.

The display was also cancelled in 2020 due to the social distancing restrictions during the COVID-19 pandemic in Jersey.

Accidents and incidents related to air show
 September 1991: The Hawker Hurricane IIC LF363 suffered an engine failure en route to Jersey and crash-landed at RAF Wittering.
 6 September 2006: A privately owned T-33 crashed on take-off close to the Imperial War Museum Duxford, on its way to the Jersey show.
 10 September 2003: A Harrier jet experienced hydraulic problems shortly before landing at Jersey Airport.
 9 September 2003: A Hawk overshot the runway while landing at Jersey Airport in advance of an air display. Minor damage was caused to the aircraft.

References

Air shows
Jersey culture
Annual events in Jersey
Autumn events in Jersey